The 1907 Cork Senior Football Championship was the 21st staging of the Cork Senior Football Championship since its establishment by the Cork County Board in 1887.

Fermoy were the defending champions.

On 2 February 1908, Lees won the championship following a 0-07 to 1-02 defeat of Macroom in the fina. This was their seventh title overall and their first title since 1904.

Results

Final

References

Cork Senior Football Championship